The 1977 Nashville 420 was a NASCAR Winston Cup Series event that took place on July 16, 1977, at Nashville Speedway in Nashville, Tennessee.

Background
Nashville Speedway was converted to a half-mile paved oval in 1957, when it began to be a NASCAR series track. The speedway was lengthened between the 1969 and 1970 seasons. The corners were cut down from 35 degrees to their present 18 degrees in 1972.

Summary
The race took three hours, ten minutes, and nine seconds to successfully complete. Darrell Waltrip defeated Bobby Allison by more than one lap in front of seventeen thousand and five hundred people. This race was important to Waltrip as this track was considered his "local" Winston Cup Series track at the time. Ten cautions were given for fifty-four laps. Total winnings for this race were $56,175 ($ when adjusted for inflation) and the winner walked away with $9,415 of that amount ($ when adjusted for inflation).

Waltrip was overcome by the excessive heat shortly after the race. As a result, he took oxygen while on top of his vehicle's hood and wasn't lucid enough to give a post-race interview. Ronnie Thomas was supposed to make his debut on this track but got into a wreck and didn't get it fixed in time to qualify. He would make his debut in the 1977 running of the Old Dominion 500 (now Tums Fast Relief 500) instead.

Mike Kempton made his official NASCAR debut in this event while Henley Gray would retire from professional stock car racing as a driver after this event.

Qualifying

Finishers

 Darrell Waltrip (drove a 1977 Chevrolet Chevelle Laguna vehicle)
 Bobby Allison (drove a 1977 Matador vehicle)
 Richard Petty (originally scored in second but was later dropped to third)
 Cale Yarborough
 Dick Brooks†
 Buddy Baker†
 Skip Manning
 J.D. McDuffie†
 Buddy Arrington
 Ricky Rudd
 Coo Coo Marlin†
 Frank Warren†
 Tighe Scott
 D. K. Ulrich
 Janet Guthrie
 Baxter Price
 Henley Gray
 Benny Parsons*†
 James Hylton†
 Cecil Gordon†
 Neil Bonnett*†
 David Sisco*†
 Ralph Jones*
 Sam Sommers*
 Grant Adcox*†
 Gary Myers*
 Richard Childress*
 Elmo Langley*†
 Jimmy Means*
 Mike Kempton*

† signifies that the driver is known to be deceased 
* Driver failed to finish race

Timeline
Section reference:
 Start: Benny Parsons was leading the racing grid as the green flag was waved in the air.
 Lap 12: Mike Kempton overheated his vehicle, making him the last-place finisher.
 Lap 15: Ignition problems knocked Jimmy Means out of the race.
 Lap 18: Elmo Langley blew his engine while driving at high speeds.
 Lap 30: Richard Childress had a terminal crash.
 Lap 33: Neil Bonnett took over the lead from Benny Parsons.
 Lap 37: The rear end of Gary Myers' vehicle came off in an unsafe manner.
 Lap 71: Cale Yarborough took over the lead from Neil Bonnett.
 Lap 80: Darrell Waltrip took over the lead from Cale Yarborough.
 Lap 122: Grant Adcox blew his engine while driving at high speeds.
 Lap 128: The rear end of Sam Sommers' vehicle came off in an unsafe manner.
 Lap 129: Bobby Allison took over the lead from Darrell Waltrip.
 Lap 131: Richard Petty took over the lead from Bobby Allison.
 Lap 137: Ralph Jones managed to ruin his vehicle's brakes while driving at high speeds.
 Lap 141: Bobby Allison took over the lead from Richard Petty.
 Lap 146: David Sisco blew his engine while driving at high speeds.
 Lap 170: Darrell Waltrip took over the lead from Bobby Allison.
 Lap 187: Neil Bonnett blew his engine while driving at high speeds.
 Lap 381: Benny Parsons blew his engine while driving at high speeds.
 Finish: Darrell Waltrip was officially declared the winner of the race.

Standings after the race

References

Nashville 420
Nashville 420
NASCAR races at Fairgrounds Speedway